Belman may refer to:

Belmannu or Belman, a small town in Karkala, Udupi, Karnataka, India
 Belman, an Australian guitar company

People
Belman is also a surname.
 Jamie Belman (born 1985), English actor
 José Belman, Spanish football goalkeeper

See also 
 Bellman (disambiguation)